Juan de Ortega was a Catholic prelate who served as the first Bishop of Almería (1492–1515).

Biography
On 21 May 1492, he was selected by the King of Spain and confirmed by Pope Innocent VIII as Bishop of Almería. He served as Bishop of Almería until his death in 1515.

References 

1515 deaths
16th-century Roman Catholic bishops in Spain
Bishops appointed by Pope Innocent VIII